Sandro Leonardo Morales (born 11 April 1991) is an Argentine professional footballer who plays as a centre-back or right-back for Club de Gimnasia y Esgrima La Plata.

Career
Morales had spells with Tabossi and Viale FBC, prior to joining Belgrano of Torneo Argentino B. He remained with Belgrano in Torneo Argentino B and subsequently Torneo Federal B between 2012 and 2015, making twenty appearances in his final season of 2015. 2016 saw Morales join Atlético Paraná in Primera B Nacional. He made his pro debut on 10 April during a tie with Independiente Rivadavia. In the following September, he scored his first goal for Atlético Paraná in a match with Nueva Chicago. Overall, Morales scored two goals in thirty-eight games for the club. In July 2017, Argentine Primera División side Patronato signed Morales.

He never featured for Patronato's first-team, leaving on 1 July 2018 to join Primera B Nacional's Santamarina.

Career statistics
.

References

External links

1991 births
Living people
People from Paraná Department
Argentine footballers
Association football defenders
Torneo Argentino B players
Primera Nacional players
Argentine Primera División players
Club Atlético Paraná players
Club Atlético Patronato footballers
Club y Biblioteca Ramón Santamarina footballers
Club de Gimnasia y Esgrima La Plata footballers
Sportspeople from Entre Ríos Province